John Oliver Crompton Phillips  (born 1947) is a New Zealand historian, author and encyclopedist. He was the general editor of Te Ara: The Encyclopedia of New Zealand, the official encyclopedia of New Zealand.

Career
Born and raised in Christchurch, Phillips graduated with a BA at Victoria University of Wellington, followed by a MA and PhD at Harvard in 1978. Returning to Wellington was a Lecturer, Senior Lecturer and Reader in History at Victoria. He was founding director of the Stout Research Centre (established by the will of the grandson of Robert Stout).

Moving to the Department of Internal Affairs in 1989, Phillips was Chief Historian (1989–1997 and 2000–2002) and General Manager, Heritage (Acting) (1997–2000). He was Conceptual Leader (history) for Museum of New Zealand Te Papa Tongarewa 1994–1998, in the lead-up to its radical transformation, accompanying its move to new waterfront premises.

From 2002 to 2011, Phillips was general editor of Te Ara, (New Zealand's online encyclopedia) and then its managing editor of content from 2011 to 2014.

Phillips was mentioned in cables released by WikiLeaks as an expert on New Zealanders' attitude to war:

and

Honours, awards and posts
 Awarded the 2014 Prime Minister's Award for Literary Achievement in non-fiction, for his role as general editor of Te Ara: The Encyclopedia of New Zealand.
 Appointed an Officer of the New Zealand Order of Merit, for services to historical research and publishing, in the 2013 Queen's Birthday Honours
 2011 recipient of the Royal Society of New Zealand's Pou Aronui Award for service to the humanities-aronui
 Member of the Council of the Victoria University of Wellington by election by the Court of Convocation
 Member of the New Zealand-US Education Foundation since 1995
 President of the National Library Society in 1994

Published works
 Te Ara Blog contributions by Jock Phillips. November 2007–
 Phillips, Jock. Biography in New Zealand,  Allen & Unwin. . 1985.
 Jock Phillips and  Ellen Ellis. Brief Encounter: American forces and the New Zealand people, 1942–1945. Historical Branch, Dept. of Internal Affairs. , 1992.
 Phillips, Jock. The '51 Lockout: The Last Hurrah. David Grant, The Big Blue: Snapshots of the 1951 Waterfront Lockout. Canterbury University Press, Labour History Project. . 2004.
 Phillips, Jock.  Aberhart, Laurence. et al.  The Caravan. McNamara Gallery. . 2002.
 Phillips, Jock. Dalley, Bronwym. Going Public: The Changing Face of New Zealand History. Auckland University Press. , 2001.
 Phillips, Jock. Boyack, Nicholas. Malone E.P. Great Adventure: New Zealand Soldiers Describe the First World War. Allen & Unwin. . 1988.
 Phillips, Jock. Maclean Chris. In the Light of the Past: Stained Glass Windows in New Zealand Houses. Oxford University Press. , 1983.
 Phillips, Jock. Man's Country? The Image of the Pakeha Male, A History. Penguin , 1987. , 1996.
 Phillips, Jock. New Worlds? The Comparative History of New Zealand and the United States. NZ-US Education Foundation ; Stout Research Centre,   c1989.
 Phillips, Jock. New Zealand Memorial: 11 November 2006. Ministry for Culture & Heritage, 2006.
 Phillips, Jock  Royal Summer: The Visit of Queen Elizabeth II and Prince Philip to New Zealand, 1953–54. Historical Branch, Dept. of Internal Affairs; Daphne Brasell Associates Press. , 1993.
 Phillips, Jock. Hearn Terry. Settlers: New Zealand immigrants from England, Ireland & Scotland, 1800–1945. Auckland University Press. . 2008.
 Phillips, Jock. Maclean Chris. Sorrow and the Pride: New Zealand War Memorials; editor Debbie Willis. : Historical Branch ; GP Books.   c1990.
 Unique Sort of Battle: New Zealanders Remember Crete / edited by Megan Hutching ; with Ian McGibbon, Jock Phillips and David Filer ; foreword by Helen Clark.  HarperCollins New Zealand / History Group, Ministry for Culture and Heritage. , 2001.
 Phillips, Jock. Te Whenua, Te Iwi: The Land and the People. Allen & Unwin/Port Nicholson Press / Stout Research Centre. , 1987.
Phillips, Jock. Making History: a New Zealand Story. Auckland University Press. , 2019.

References

1947 births
Living people
Harvard University alumni
Victoria University of Wellington alumni
Academic staff of the Victoria University of Wellington
20th-century New Zealand historians
Encyclopedists
Writers from Christchurch
New Zealand public servants
Officers of the New Zealand Order of Merit
People associated with the Museum of New Zealand Te Papa Tongarewa
21st-century New Zealand historians